Mika Kristian Myllylä (12 September 1969 – 5 July 2011) was a Finnish cross-country skier who competed from 1992 to 2005. He won six medals at the Winter Olympics, earning one gold (1998: 30 km), one silver (1994: 50 km), and four bronzes (1994: 30 km, 4 × 10 km; 1998: 10 km, 4 × 10 km).

Myllylä also won a total of nine medals at the FIS Nordic World Ski Championships, winning four golds (1997: 50 km, 1999: 10 km, 30 km, 50 km), three silvers (10 km + 15 km combined pursuit: 1997, 1999; 4 × 10 km relay: 1997), and two bronzes (10 km: 1995, 1997).

He was on his way to become one of the greatest stars in cross-country skiing history, until he was caught doping in the Finnish 2001 FIS Nordic World Ski Championships scandal for taking hydroxyethyl starch (HES), a blood plasma expander usually used to cover up the use of erythropoietin (EPO) in athletes. The scandal also affected five other Finnish skiers, including Jari Isometsä and Harri Kirvesniemi. Myllylä received a two-year suspension from the FIS as a result. In connection with a 2011 court case, Myllylä gave a sworn statement where he admitted using EPO in the 1990s, during his career.

After the suspension Myllylä tried to return to skiing, but failed to come back to the international level despite winning a few Finnish championships. Myllylä retired from the skiing sports in 2005. In the following years he was involved in alcohol-related problems which were extensively covered in Finnish tabloid papers. On 5 July 2011, Myllylä was found dead at his home in Kokkola. The official police investigation concluded that his death was the result of an accident, and ruled out the possibility of foul play and suicide.

Cross-country skiing results
All results are sourced from the International Ski Federation (FIS).

Olympic Games
 6 medals – (1 gold, 1 silver, 4 bronze)

World Championships
 9 medals – (4 gold, 3 silver, 2 bronze)

World Cup

Season titles
 1 title – (1 Long Distance)

Season standings

a.  29th in the Long Distance World Cup.     26th in the Middle Distance World Cup.

Individual podiums
 10 victories 
 25 podiums

Team podiums
 6 victories – (6 ) 
 15 podiums – (14 , 1 ) 

Note:  Until the 1999 World Championships and the 1994 Olympics, World Championship and Olympic races were included in the World Cup scoring system.

Overall record

a.  Classification is made according to FIS classification.
b.  Includes individual and mass start races.
c.  Incomplete due to lack of appropriate sources prior to 2001.

Note: Until 1999 World Championships and 1994 Olympics, World Championship and Olympic races are part of the World Cup. Hence results from those races are included in the World Cup overall record.

See also
List of sportspeople sanctioned for doping offences

References

Sources
 
 
 Myllylä, Mika: Riisuttu mestari. Tammi. 2001.

External links 
 

1969 births
2011 deaths
Finnish male cross-country skiers
Cross-country skiers at the 1992 Winter Olympics
Cross-country skiers at the 1994 Winter Olympics
Cross-country skiers at the 1998 Winter Olympics
Olympic cross-country skiers of Finland
Medalists at the 1994 Winter Olympics
Medalists at the 1998 Winter Olympics
Olympic medalists in cross-country skiing
Olympic gold medalists for Finland
Olympic silver medalists for Finland
Olympic bronze medalists for Finland
FIS Nordic World Ski Championships medalists in cross-country skiing
Doping cases in cross-country skiing
Finnish sportspeople in doping cases
Accidental deaths in Finland
People from Haapajärvi
Sportspeople from North Ostrobothnia